The year 1967 was the 186th year of the Rattanakosin Kingdom of Thailand. It was the 22nd year in the reign of King Bhumibol Adulyadej (Rama IX), and is reckoned as year 2510 in the Buddhist Era.

Incumbents
King: Bhumibol Adulyadej 
Crown Prince: (vacant)
Prime Minister: Thanom Kittikachorn
Supreme Patriarch: Ariyavongsagatanana V

Events

June
6-29- King Bhumibol Adulyadej and Queen Sirikit visits the United States for a second time.

Births
21 June - Yingluck Shinawatra, Former Thai Prime Minister

 
Years of the 20th century in Thailand
Thailand
Thailand
1960s in Thailand